Lorenza Jachia (born 24 October 1968) is an Italian former professional tennis player.

Jachia reached a best singles ranking of 144 in the world, with her best WTA Tour performance a quarter-final appearance at Perugia in 1986. She made the final qualifying round of the 1991 French Open.

ITF finals

Singles: 4 (3–1)

Doubles: 1 (1–0)

References

External links
 
 

1968 births
Living people
Italian female tennis players